Vimala Menon, known popularly as Kalamandalam Vimala Menon is an Indian dance teacher and Mohiniyattam exponent from Kerala. She is the founder and Director of Kerala Natya Academy in Thiruvananthapuram.

Early life and education

Vimala was born into an affluent family in a village in Irinjalakuda, Thrissur district. She is the second of seven children born to S. K. Krishnan Nair, a civil engineer, and Vishalakshy Amma. Vimala learned her initial dance lessons from Thripunithura Vijaya Bhanu. She also had her training in Carnatic music under M. R. Madhusudhana Menon. After completing her school education, she joined Kerala Kalamandalam for a four-year diploma course in dance in 1960. At Kalamandalam, she had training in Mohiniyattam under the tutelage of Pazhayannoor Chinnammu Amma and Kalamandalam Satyabhama. She also studied Bharata Natyam under Thanjavoor Bhaskara Rao.

While working as a dance teacher in the Jawahar School at Neyveli Lignite Corporation, she married Viswanatha Menon. After the marriage in 1966, she accompanied her husband to live in Bhutan where he was an officer with Bhutan government. She has a son, Vinod and a daughter Vinduja Menon who acted in several Malayalam films, including Pavithram and Njan Gandharvan.

During her stay in Bhutan, Vimala taught dance in the Bhutan Government School and performed South Indian Classical dance in many places.

Awards and honours

During her long career, Vimala Menon won several awards and honours, including the Kerala Sangeetha Nataka Akademi Award in 1991 and the Kendra Sangeeta Nataka Akademi Award in 2006. She received the All Kerala Social Service Association Award for Bharata Natyam in 1972. She won the Senior Fellowship Award for her research work in "Ramanattom in Mohiniyattom" by the Government of India's Cultural Department in 2004. Vimala also received the Kerala Kalamandalam Award for Dance from Kerala Kalamandalam for her contribution to South Indian Classical Dances. In 2014, she received the Kerala Sangeetha Nataka Akademi Fellowship.

References

External links

Living people
Malayali people
Performers of Indian classical dance
Indian dance teachers
Artists from Thrissur
Recipients of the Sangeet Natak Akademi Award
1943 births
Mohiniyattam exponents
People from Irinjalakuda
Dancers from Kerala
Teachers of Indian classical dance
20th-century Indian dancers
20th-century Indian women artists
20th-century Indian educators
Women educators from Kerala
Women artists from Kerala
Educators from Kerala
Indian female classical dancers
20th-century women educators
Recipients of the Kerala Sangeetha Nataka Akademi Fellowship
Recipients of the Kerala Sangeetha Nataka Akademi Award